The Holden Commodore (VH) is a mid-size car that was produced by Holden from 1981 to 1984. It was the third iteration of the first generation of the Holden Commodore.

This new Commodore was an evolution of the previous Holden VC series model, and was released on 5 October 1981. The frontal appearance was mildly facelifted with a new horizontal-slat grille and new lighting components designed to give a lower, wider look, and for interest of aerodynamics. It continued to be available as sedan and station wagon, with new taillight clusters utilized on sedan models.

History
The engines were carried over but revisions were made to the 1.9- and 2.85-litre engines to improve fuel economy. Gains of 12.5 and 14 percent respectively were made to the city cycle fuel economy figures.

Mechanical specifications were as before, except for an additional five-speed manual transmission which was an option only (due to the limits of the transmission-box) on the 1.9-litre four-cylinder and 2.85-litre straight six versions. A 4142 cc V8 engine (marketed as the 4.2 litre V8) was also available from the beginning. This was later complemented by the more powerful 5.0 litre V8.

At the same time a reshuffle was made to the range—SL was now the base model and SL/X was introduced as the mid-range car, with SL/E remaining the top-of-the-line sedan. The SL/E also came available with optional cruise control and a trip computer.  The trip computer measured average speed and fuel consumption. Wagons were available in SL and SL/X variants.

September 1982 saw the release of the Commodore SS, a model that was a Commodore mainstay until 2017. The abbreviation stands for "Super Sport". Offered with Holden's 4.2 L V8 as standard, the factory SS was supplemented by three up-spec versions produced by Peter Brock's HDT Special Vehicles company. The HDT models were named "SS Group One", "SS Group Two" and "SS Group Three", with the lattermost also featuring the Holden 5.0-litre V8 in a higher state of tune). The SS sedans were initially exclusively Maranello Red in color, but were later also made available in Alabaster White. The Group Three-tuned V8 produces  at 4750 rpm.

In 1983 an 'Executive' pack of the base Commodore was introduced, primarily directed to fleet buyers. These cars featured automatic transmission and air-conditioning as part of a Commodore SL package, but had no distinguishable external identification badges. Special editions of Commodore released around Christmas 1981, 1982 and 1983 were badged 'Vacationer'.

With the effects of the 1979 energy crisis ending, buyers gravitated towards the larger Ford Falcon rival, rather than the mid-size Commodore. Thus for the first time, the Holden Commodore lost its position as Australia's best-selling car.

Production of this model ceased in February 1984, to be replaced by the much further facelifted Holden Commodore (VK).

Export markets
In Indonesia the only engine available was the 1.9-liter four, in SL/X trim and with a five-speed manual.

Motorsport
The VH Commodore was first used in Australian Touring car racing in the 1982 Australian Touring Car Championship. Unfortunately controversy reigned as the Holden Dealer Team attempted to run Peter Brock's car with yet-to-be homologated parts. Brock actually scored enough points to win the 1982 ATCC (using both the VC and VH), but was disqualified from all but two races of the series.

Better was to come in the late season endurance races. The Holden VH Commodore SS went on to fill the top 4 places in the race with the HDT Commodore of Peter Brock and Larry Perkins winning the race.

The Commodore was still a major force in the 1983 Australian Touring Car Championship with both Grice and Brock each winning two of the eight round series. However, they were forced to give best to Allan Moffat and his smaller, lighter (and thus much better suited to the tight Australian tracks) Mazda RX-7. Moffat won four of the eight rounds, and with the emergence of the smaller capacity Nissan Bluebird turbo of George Fury, Brock and Grice finished only 3rd and 4th at the end of the championship.

Further homologations grants from the Confederation of Australian Motorsport (CAMS) in August 1983 saw the VH Commodore SS once again the car to beat. Peter Brock set pole position at the 1983 James Hardie 1000 (VH Commodores filled seven of the top 10 spots on the grid), and although his own car suffered a rare engine failure on lap 8 of the race, he and Perkins then moved into the team's second car with its lead driver John Harvey to go on and win the race. The second HDT car was in fact the 1982 winning car giving the Commodore the distinction of being the only car to twice win the Bathurst 1000. The VH Commodore would fill six of the top 10 finishing positions in the race.

The VH continued to be a major force into 1984, with Brock winning the opening two rounds of the 1984 ATCC before finishing second to Moffat's Mazda in Round 3. Unfortunately however Brock was to miss two rounds of the series while racing a Porsche 956 at the 1000 km of Silverstone and Le Mans 24 Hours. Brock would eventually finish second in the championship behind the Ford XE Falcon of Dick Johnson. The VH Commodore SS has the distinction of winning the final ATCC race held under the locally developed Group C regulations when Allan Grice won the 7th and final round of the championship at the Adelaide International Raceway on 1 July.

The VH Commodore SS was succeeded by the Holden VK Commodore in the last half of 1984, though it was only the HDT, Roadways and Warren Cullen's team who would race the new model. The VH remained the Commodore of choice for the privateers. The model's touring car racing life ended at the completion of the 1984 season as CAMS had decided that new rules based on the FIA's international Group A regulations would apply to Australian Touring Cars from the beginning of 1985.

The VH Commodore also proved to be popular in Sports Sedan racing as well as in speedway.

References

Cars of Australia
VH
Mid-size cars
Rear-wheel-drive vehicles
Sedans
Station wagons
Cars introduced in 1981
1980s cars
Cars discontinued in 1984